John Woods (born 8 December 1955) is an Irish long-distance runner. He competed in the men's marathon at the 1988 Summer Olympics.

References

1955 births
Living people
Athletes (track and field) at the 1988 Summer Olympics
Irish male long-distance runners
Irish male marathon runners
Olympic athletes of Ireland
Sportspeople from Liverpool